Carboxypeptidase A3 (mast cell carboxypeptidase A), also known as CPA3, is an enzyme which in humans is encoded by the CPA3 gene. The "CPA3" gene expression has only been detected in mast cells and mast-cell-like lines, and CPA3 is located in secretory granules. CPA3 is one of 8-9 members of the A/B subfamily that includes the well-studied pancreatic enzymes carboxypeptidase A1 (CPA1), carboxypeptidase A2 (CPA2), and carboxypeptidase B. This subfamily includes 6 carboxypeptidase A-like enzymes, numbered 1-6. The enzyme now called CPA3 was originally named mast cell carboxypeptidase A, and another protein was initially called CPA3. A gene nomenclature committee renamed mast cell carboxypeptidase A as CPA3, and the original CPA3 reported by Huang et al. became CPA4 to reflect the order of their discovery.

Structure

Gene
The "CPA3" gene is a 32kb-gene located at chromosome 3q24, consisting of 11 exons.

Protein
CPA3 shares significant homology with the CPA subfamily of metalloprecarboxypeptidases and all the residues essential for the coordination of the Zn2+ active site, substrate peptide anchoring, and CP activity are preserved in the putative CPA3 protein. It resembles pancreatic CPA1 in cleaving C-terminal aromatic and aliphatic amino acid residues.CPA3 contains an N-terminal sequence of 16 amino acids and a pro-peptide between the NH2-terminal signal peptide sequence and COOH-terminal CP moiety.

Function 

CPA3 has a pH optimum in the neutral to basic range. CPA3 functions together with endopeptidases secreted from mast cells such as chymases and tryptases to degrade proteins and peptides, including the apolipoprotein B component of LDL particles and  angiotensin I.  Upon mast cell activation and degranulation, CPA3, the chymases, and tryptases are released in complexes with heparin proteoglycan. The parasitic nematode Ascaris produces CPA3 inhibitors, which increase its survival during infection. This finding implies that CPA3 might be involved in host defense against certain parasites. CPA3 is also reported to have an important role in the protection towards snake venom toxins and vasoconstricting peptide endothelin 1(ET1).

Clinical significance

CPA3 provides protection from ET-1-induced damage, suggesting CPA3 could have a role in regulating sepsis. The involvement of CPA3 in autoimmune disease models makes it a potential diagnostic parameter of related diseases. The significantly increased concentration of CPA3 in drug-induced anaphylaxis also implies that CPA3 could serve as a diagnostic parameter and detection of it could improve the forensic identification. A new mast cell subtype reported to appear in mucosa is implicated in allergic inflammation and these mast cells have high levels of CPA3. The highly upregulated transcript of CPA3 is readily detected in luminal brushings and biopsies, making it a useful biomarker of allergic inflammation.

Interactions 

CPA3 has been known to interact with:
Heparin
PCI
SR48692
Tissue carboxypeptidase inhibitor
Neurotensin

References

External links

Further reading